Susan White, known as Susan Clarencius (before 1510 – in or after 1564), was a favourite lady in waiting and longtime friend of Queen Mary I of England.

Family
Susan's family, the Whites of Hutton, were a cadet branch of the White family of South Warnborough, Hampshire. According to Loades, Susan was "probably the youngest" of the four children of Richard White of Hutton, Essex and Maud Tyrrell, the daughter of Sir William Tyrrell of Heron, Essex. She had two sisters: Mary, who first married a husband surnamed Whitehead and secondly a husband surnamed Spenser, and Joan, who married a husband surnamed Wilcocks; and a brother, Richard White, who married Margaret Strelley, the daughter of Nicholas Strelley of Strelley, Nottinghamshire, by whom he had a son, George White (d. 14 June 1584).

Life
At some time before 1534 she married Thomas Tonge, who on 2 June 1534 became Clarenceux King of Arms. He died less than two years later, in March 1536, naming her his sole executor and leaving her the residue of his estate. Despite the brevity of his tenure as Clarenceux King of Arms, Susan was known as Susan Clarencius for the remainder of her life.

She joined Princess Mary's household as a maid in waiting when Mary was sent to the Welsh Marches as heiress presumptive in 1525. She lost her position in 1533, because Mary's household was dissolved due to her refusal to acknowledge Anne Boleyn as her father's wife. When Mary's household was reinstated, after she succumbed to pressure by her father's officials in 1536, Susan returned to her service at Mary's request.

By June 1536, Mary considered her a trusted servant, and their close personal relationship lasted for the remainder of Mary's life.

After Mary's accession to the throne in 1553, Susan Clarencius was named Mistress of the Robes. She was regarded as the queen's closest confidante and received many gifts from her, including generous grants of land in Essex.
When Mary was looking for a suitable husband in 1554, Clarencius spoke strongly in favour of Philip II of Spain. During Queen Mary's phantom pregnancy, Susan kept on assuring her that she was indeed with child, although she voiced strong doubts about her mistress's pregnancy to the French ambassador Antoine de Noailles. Susan had a reputation for being devious and greedy, as evidenced by a report by Venetian ambassador Giovanni Michieli, in which he states that she persuaded him to make a gift to Queen Mary of his coach and horses, which the queen subsequently gave to Susan.

Susan survived her royal mistress. Following Queen Mary's death in 1558, she emigrated to Spain with another of Mary's former servants, Jane Dormer, the wife of Gomez Suarez de Figueroa of Cordova, 1st Duke of Feria, a friend of Philip of Spain's. As there is no further mention of her in the records after the spring of 1564, she probably died about that time while a member of Feria's household.

Little else is known of her life. Susan Clarencius apparently had no children, at least none that survived infancy.

Notes

References

External links
White, George (c.1530-84), of Hutton, Essex, History of Parliament. Retrieved 30 April 2013
The White Family of Hutton. Retrieved 30 April 2013
White, Sir Thomas (1507-66), of South Warnborough, Hampshire, History of Parliament. Retrieved 1 May 2013
Will of Thomas Tonge of Saint John Clerkenwell, Middlesex, proved 4 April 1536, National Archives. Retrieved 30 April 2013

British maids of honour
Year of death missing
16th-century English women
English ladies-in-waiting
Year of birth uncertain
Court of Mary I of England
People from Hutton, Essex